A veggie burger is a hamburger patty that does not contain meat. It may be made from ingredients like beans, especially soybeans and tofu, nuts, grains, seeds or fungi such as mushrooms or mycoprotein.

The patties that are the essence of a veggie burger have existed in various Eurasian cuisines for millennia, including in the form of disc-shaped grilled or fried meatballs or as koftas, a commonplace item in Indian cuisine.  These may contain meats or be made of entirely vegetarian ingredients such as legumes or other plant-derived proteins.

Origin
There have been numerous claims of invention of the veggie burger. The dish, by name, may have been created in London in 1982 by Gregory Sams, who called it the 'VegeBurger'. Sams and his brother Craig had run a natural food restaurant in Paddington since the 1960s; a Carrefour hypermarket in Southampton sold 2000 packets in three weeks after its launch. An earlier reference can be heard in the 7 June 1948 episode of the American radio drama series Let George Do It called "The Mister Mirch Case" where a character refers to "vegeburgers" as a burger made of nuts and legumes.

Using the name Gardenburger, an early veggie burger was developed by Paul Wenner around 1980 or 1981 in Wenner's vegetarian restaurant, The Gardenhouse, in Gresham, Oregon.

Restaurants
Some fast food companies have been offering vegetarian foods increasingly since the beginning of the 21st century.

India
In India where vegetarianism is widespread, McDonald's, Burger King, Wendy's and KFC serve veggie burgers. In 2012, McDonald's opened its first vegetarian-only restaurant in India.

United States
Burger King introduced a veggie burger in 2002, the first to be made available nationally in the U.S. They have also sold veggie burgers in their Australian franchise, Hungry Jack's.

Veggie burgers have been sold in certain Subways and Harvey's, as well as many chain restaurants, such as Red Robin, Chili's, Denny's, Friendly's, Culvers, Johnny Rockets, and Hard Rock Cafe. Occasionally the veggie burger option will appear at the bottom of a menu as a possible substitution for beef or turkey burgers, rather than as an individual menu item.

McDonald's

Different kinds of veggie burgers, including the vegetarian McVeggie and the vegan McVegan, are also served permanently in McDonald's restaurants in:
 India (McVeggie, consisting of a fried, breaded patty of ground vegetables, with lettuce and ketchup, in a wholewheat, sesame or focaccia bun)
 Bahrain
 Cheung Chau, Hong Kong (McVeggie, in Cheung Chau Bun Festival)
 Egypt (McFalafel, consisting of a falafel patty with tomato, lettuce and tahini sauce)
 Finland (McVegan)
 Germany since February 2010, McDonald's Germany, its fourth-biggest global market, is serving veggie burgers in all its restaurants.
 Greece (McVeggie, consisting of a breaded and fried vegetable patty with tomato, iceberg lettuce and ketchup, in a sesame bun)
 Malaysia
 The Netherlands (Groentenburger=Vegetable Burger)
 Portugal (McVeggie, since November 2016)
 New Zealand (McVeggie, since December 2019)
 Sweden (McVegan)
 Switzerland (Vegi Mac)
 United Arab Emirates
 United Kingdom: MacDonald's are notable as the only major UK burger chain that does not offer a meat-substitute or meat-like burger product, instead using a partly mashed mixed vegetable product (Vegetable Deluxe)

Manufacturing process 
Manufacturing often follows certain steps. One commercial recipe runs as follows.

The grains and vegetables used in the patties are first washed and thoroughly cleaned to help ensure the removal of dirt, bacteria, chemical residues, and other materials that may be on the raw products. This process can either be done by hand or through the use of machinery such as high-pressure sprayers. With the use of a conveyor belt, the food is moved along under a high-pressure sprayer to remove the debris listed above. Another method that may be used by companies is the use of a hollow drum which circulates the food while water is sprayed onto it to remove the debris.

Next, a steam-heated mixer is used to cook the grain and remove any extra debris and excess water. The mixer typically has oils within it (such as safflower oil). As the oil simmers, the grains are gradually added in and the blades are used to mix the grains around. The steam created in the mixer allows the grains to cook resulting in a puree.

Next the vegetables are cut up into smaller pieces to allow more surface area for cooking purposes. This can be done by hand or through the use of machines in factories.

The vegetables are then added to the grain mixture in the steam-heated mixture. The exact ratio of grains to vegetables is unique to each company, resulting in different textures and tastes that are produced.

As the vegetables are being cooked in the mixer, their natural sugars release, resulting in caramelization. The sweet flavors thus created from this caramelization are mixed uniformly in the mixer. The technique used for the creation of this caramelization mixture is called mirepoix. This technique is very important to the production of veggie burgers, as it adds both texture and flavor to the patty.

The mirepoix mixture is then placed into another mixing tub, where dry ingredients such as oats, walnuts, potato flakes, and more are added. The mixture is then folded together to make a uniform mix. The moisture from the vegetables causes the mixture to become sticky, thus clumping together like cookie dough. This is important, as it allows the veggie burger to stick together to form the patty.

The mixture is now put into an automatic patty-making machine or press. The press then punches out the patties into a disc shape onto a conveyor belt underneath. A constant spray of water may also be used to prevent any of the mixture from sticking to machinery parts. Once on the conveyor tray, the patties move along to be put onto baking trays.

Patties are first inspected to make sure they are the correct shape, size, and texture to ensure a high-quality product. The trays are then put into a heated convection oven at a designated temperature and time.

Once out of the oven, the patties are quickly frozen with techniques such as individual quick freezing and cryogenic freezing. These quick-freezing methods freeze the patties within 30 minutes to lock in nutrients and preserve texture by the formation of a number of small ice crystals.

The frozen patties are again placed on a conveyor belt that takes them to a vacuum-packaging machine. The machine seals the patties into measured plastic sleeves and draws out any excess air. The packages are then loaded into printed cardboard boxes with the aid of another machine or done manually. The flaps on the box are then sealed closed and the product is kept in temperature-controlled storage before, during, and after delivery to grocery stores.

Ingredients purpose

Grains 

Grains are primarily used in the manufacturing of veggie burgers to act as a meat substitute. The grains, such as rice and wheat, provide carbohydrates and protein components and to provide bulk to the patty. They also provide texture to the burger, which can change depending on the type of grain used. This texture and look is important as they wish to make the patty look like a beef patty.

Vegetables 
Vegetables such as corn, carrots, and mushrooms, provide the patty with texture and taste. Additionally, they provide moisture when heated. This allows the disc shape without breaking apart easily. The vegetables also provide nutrients with the addition of some vitamins and minerals.

Dry ingredients 
Adding dry ingredients, such as oats, flours, nuts, or breadcrumbs, can absorb excess moisture and liquid, which results in the patty sticking together tightly. This could turn the moist veggie patties into a sticky consistency, which also helps the patties shape easily. Dry ingredients provide proteins and fiber, which add nutritional value to the veggie patty. Dry ingredients, such as walnuts and almonds, are also rich in energy, vitamins and minerals.

Stabilizers 
Tapioca starch and vegetable gum are two common ingredients used as stabilizers in veggie burger. Tapioca starch is often used as a thickening agent for manufactured foods due to its cheaper price. It gets sticky once it is wet, which helps to hold the burger patty tightly together. This prevents the patty from breaking apart. Vegetable gum provides negligible nutrients, but it also helps to hold everything together in the patty.

Oils 
Oils, such as safflower, coconut, and olive oil, can lubricate the grain mix, and allow further cooking processing when the wheat is added. This facilitates the Maillard reaction and makes the veggie patty taste better by bringing out its flavors. Oils can also prevent the ingredients from sticking to the mixing machine, thus allowing them to be mixed well and heated together.

Preservatives 
Salt is typically used for flavor, but may be used as a preservative in veggie burgers. With the use of salt, the water activity of the food is reduced. This helps prevent the growth of micro-organisms and prolongs the shelf life of the food.

Naming
In October 2020, the EU rejected an amendment proposed by the Committee on Agriculture and Rural Development which, if passed, would have resulted in companies being forced to call veggie burgers by the term "veggie discs".

Gallery

See also

References

Further reading

External links

 Veggie Burger Recipes

Fast food
American sandwiches
British sandwiches
Meat substitutes
Vegan cuisine
Vegetarian cuisine
Hamburgers (food)